The Opposite Sex, also known under the working title of A Bet's A Bet, is a 2014 small-budget indie film that was directed by Jennifer Finnigan and Jonathan Silverman, and is their co-directorial debut. It was released to Blu-ray on October 22, 2014, in Sweden and Finland and received a United States release on May 21, 2015. The film was also released to theaters overseas as Poskromić Playboya. The film stars Kristin Chenoweth, Mena Suvari, Eric Roberts, Jennifer Finnigan, and Geoff Stults.

Synopsis
Vince (Geoff Stults) is a successful, driven divorce attorney who is a notorious womanizer, having affairs with his clients. He is intrigued, however, when he meets the competitive Jane (Mena Suvari), a young divorcee who resents men. The two agree to a series of bets where the winner decides the fate of the loser. Neither expects to fall in love.

Cast
 Geoff Stults as Vince
 Mena Suvari as Jane
 Kristin Chenoweth as Mrs. Kemp
 Josh Hopkins as Kenny
 Jennifer Finnigan as Stephanie
 Josh Cooke as Kendrick
 Eric Roberts as Mr. Campbell
 Dana Ashbrook as Gary
 Debra Jo Rupp as Tracy
 Jonathan Silverman as Tom
 Kenan Thompson as Mitch
 Julie Ann Dawson as Hot Club Girl
 Jennifer Jostyn as Regina
 Bridget Everett as Stella
 Jackie Moore as Madison
 Joey Fatone as Emcee
 Maria Kanellis as Hot Mess

Reception
StarPulse rated the film favorably, writing "Light, fluffy, but also very witty in its writing, "A Bet's A Bet" is harmless enjoyable fun fare." Interia Film heavily criticized the film, as they felt that there was no chemistry between its lead stars and that the film's comedy was outdated.

References

External links
 
 
 Review at Alien Bee

2014 films
2010s English-language films